Roberto Carballés Baena (born 23 March 1993) is a Spanish tennis player. He achieved a career-high ATP singles ranking of world No. 71 on 15 November 2021. His preferred surface is clay, on which he has won one ATP title and 19 ITF titles in singles.

Tennis career

2014-2015: First ATP win
In a first-round contest between two qualifiers, Carballés Baena recorded his first ATP World Tour win at the 2014 Casablanca Open as he defeated David Goffin of Belgium in straight sets. He followed this up with a tightly fought win over João Sousa in the second round. He faced lucky loser Andrey Kuznetsov in the quarterfinals and won in straight sets. His run was stopped in the semifinals by Guillermo García-López, again in a close three-set match.

2016-2018: Grand Slam debut, top 100 debut, first singles ATP title
In February 2018, he won his first ATP tournament at the 2018 Ecuador Open Quito, beating Albert Ramos Vinolas in the final. He became the 1st Spanish qualifier to win a title since Almagro at the 2006 Valencia Open and the youngest Spanish champion at age 24 since Nadal (age 24) at the 2011 Barcelona Open. This victory resulted in him reaching the highest singles ranking of his career of World No. 72 thus far.

2020-21: First doubles title & French Open third round & top-10 win, Olympics debut
In February 2020, Carballés Baena won his first ATP title in doubles at the 2020 Chile Open in Santiago, partnering with fellow Spaniard Alejandro Davidovich Fokina, where they defeated in the final the 2nd seeded pair  Arévalo/O’Mara.

He reached the third round of the 2020 French Open, his best showing at a Grand Slam in his career by defeating 9th seed Denis Shapovalov in the second round, his first top-10 win and first victory in five sets, but retired in the next round against 18th seed Grigor Dimitrov.

In April 2021, he won his first title of the year at the 2021 Belgrade Challenger.
Carballés Baena qualified to represent Spain at the 2020 Summer Olympics in singles and doubles partnering with Pablo Andujar.
In September 2021, following his 2021 US Open second round showing, he reached his third Challenger final of the year as a top seed at the 2021 Murcia Open in Spain, losing to second seed Tallon Griekspoor. At the same tournament he also reached the final in doubles partnering Alberto Barroso Campos.

2022: First ATP quarterfinal on hard court
At the 2022 Firenze Open Carballes Baena advanced to his 15th ATP Tour quarterfinal, but only his first on a surface other than clay, defeating second seed Matteo Berrettini, his third Top-20 triumph.

2023
Carballes Baena was defeated in the first round of the 2023 Australian Open in straight sets by eventual champion Novak Djokovic. 

At the ATP 250 2023 Córdoba Open he broke the record for the longest match ever in the tournament history when he lost to compatriot Bernabe Zapata Miralles in three hours and 26 minutes in the first round. The previous-longest match was in 2020, when Albert Ramos-Vinolas outlasted Pablo Andujar in three hours and 20 minutes.

ATP career finals

Singles: 1 (1 title)

Doubles: 1 (1 title)

Challenger and Futures finals

Singles: 37 (19–18)

Doubles: 9 (4–5)

Performance timelines

Singles
Current through the 2022 Miami Open.

Doubles

Record against other top 10 players
Carballés Baena's record against players who have been ranked in the top 10, with those who are active in boldface. Only ATP Tour main draw matches are considered:

Notes

References

External links
 
 

1993 births
Living people
Spanish male tennis players
People from Tenerife
Sportspeople from the Province of Santa Cruz de Tenerife
French Open junior champions
Grand Slam (tennis) champions in boys' doubles
Tennis players at the 2020 Summer Olympics
Olympic tennis players of Spain